Shiv Sena (IAST: Śhiva Sēnā) is a right-wing to far-right Marathi regionalist and Hindu ultranationalist political party in India founded in 1966 by Bal Thackeray. The party split in 2022 into Shiv Sena (Uddhav Balasaheb Thackeray) and Balasahebanchi Shiv Sena but was regained by the Eknath Shinde led Faction. Its headquarters is situated in Thane, Maharashtra.

The party emerged from the Pro-Marathi nativist movement in Bombay (present-day Mumbai), in which the party agitated for preferential treatment for the Marathi people over migrants from other parts of India. It ran a strong movement against Gujrati and South Indian people who were living in Bombay, alleging they did not respect Marathi people and their culture. Due to this, the party ran an anti-migrant agenda. Shiva Sena's election symbol is the Bow and Arrow. It uses the saffron colour in its flag and a image of a roaring tiger. From 1966 to 2022 the party was ruled by the Thackeray political family.

Although the party's primary base always remained in Maharashtra, it tried to expand to a pan-Indian base. In the 1970s, it gradually moved from advocating a pro-Marathi ideology to supporting a broader Hindu nationalist agenda, and aligned itself with the Bharatiya Janata Party (BJP). The party took part in Mumbai (BMC) municipal elections for its entire existence. In 1989, it entered into an alliance with the BJP for Lok Sabha as well as Maharashtra Legislative Assembly elections. The alliance in the latter was temporarily broken in the 2014 elections, although it was quickly reformed. Shiv Sena was a coalition partner in the BJP-led National Democratic Alliance (NDA) from 1998 until 2019, including the Vajpayee Government from 1998 to 2004 and the Narendra Modi Government from 2014 to 2019.

Under Uddhav Thackeray, Shiv Sena went through an interim ideological shift since its formation from right-wing Marathi regionalism and Hindutva nationalism towards liberalism and secularism, and composite nationalism. Under Thackeray, Shiva Sena formed an alliance with its former rivals, the liberal Indian National Congress and Nationalist Congress Party, signalling a significant departure from its traditional pro-Hindutva stance. This led to split and subsequent legal battle between the two factions, which resulted into Chief minister Eknath Shinde taking control of the party.

On 21 February 2023, Shiv Sena declared Eknath Shinde as its chief leader.

Soon later, Shiv Sena (Uddhav Balasaheb Thackeray) faction moved to Supreme Court of India. In later developments Chief Justice of India, Dhananjaya Y. Chandrachud said "They broke bread for three years. They broke bread with (Congress) and NCP for three years. What happened overnight after three years of happy marriage?" and also criticised then governor Bhagat Singh Koshiyari for being oblivious during the 2022 Maharashtra Political crisis. SC also observed that governer cannot perticipate in government fall.

Allegedly the party had a powerful hold over the Hindi film industry. It has been alleged as an "extremist", "chauvinist", or "fascist" party. Shiv Sena has been allegedly blamed for the 1970 communal violence in Bhiwandi, the 1984 Bhiwandi riot, and violence in the 1992–1993 Bombay riots.

The party draws its strength from the support of the Maratha and Kunbi communities of Maharashtra which Shiv Sena drew away from the Indian National Congress.

History

Origins
After the Independence of India in 1947, regional administrative divisions from the colonial era were gradually changed and states following linguistic borders were created. Within the Bombay Presidency, a massive popular struggle was launched for the creation of a state for the Marathi-speaking people. In 1960, the presidency was divided into two linguistic states - Gujarat and Maharashtra. Moreover, Marathi-speaking areas of the erstwhile Hyderabad state were joined with Maharashtra. Bombay, in many ways the economic capital of India, became the state capital of Maharashtra. On one hand, people belonging to the Gujarati community owned the majority of the industry and trade enterprises in the city.
On the other hand, there was a steady flow of South Indian migrants to the city who came to take many white-collar jobs.

In 1960 Bal Thackeray, a Bombay-based cartoonist, began publishing the satirical cartoon weekly Marmik. Through this publication, he started disseminating anti-migrant sentiments. On 19 June 1966, Thackeray founded the Shiv Sena as a political organisation.

The Shiv Sena attracted many unemployed Marathi youth, who were attracted by Thackeray's charged anti-migrant oratory. Shiv Sena cadres became involved in various attacks against the South Indian communities, vandalizing South Indian restaurants and pressuring employers to hire Marathis.

Alliance with the Bharatiya Janata Party
The Sena started placing more weight on the Hindutva ideology in the 1970s as the 'sons of the soil' cause was weakening.

The party began a coalition with the Bharatiya Janata Party (BJP) for seats in the Lok Sabha and the Maharashtra Assembly from 1989. The two formed a government in Maharashtra between 1995 and 1999. The Sena was the opposition party in the state along with the BJP from 1999 to 2014. However, the 25 year alliance with the BJP was threatened in 2014 Maharashtra Assembly elections over seat sharing and both contested the election independently. With the BJP becoming the largest party following the 2014 election, Sena declared opposition. However, after negotiations, Sena agreed to join the government in Maharashtra. The Shiv Sena-BJP combine governs the Brihanmumbai Municipal Corporation. Traditionally the main strongholds of Shiv Sena have been Mumbai and the Konkan coastal areas. However, in the 2004 Lok Sabha elections the result was reversed. The Shiv Sena made inroads in the interior parts of the state, while suffering losses in Mumbai.

Formation of Maharashtra Navnirman Sena
In July 2005, Former Maharashtra Chief Minister and Sena leader Narayan Rane was expelled from the party, which sparked internal conflict in the party. In December the same year Raj Thackeray, Bal Thackeray's nephew, left the party. Raj Thackeray later founded a separate party, Maharashtra Navnirman Sena (MNS). 

Although the MNS is a break-away group from the Shiv Sena, the party is still based in Bhumiputra ideology. When unveiling the party in an assembly at Shivaji Park he said, everyone is anxious to see what will happen to Hindutva and, "I shall elaborate on the party's stance on issues like Hindutva, its agenda for development of Maharashtra and the significance of the party flag colours at the 19 March public meeting."

Leadership change 
Bal Thackeray's son Uddhav Thackeray became the party's leader in 2004, although Bal Thackeray continued to be an important figurehead. After the death of Bal Thackeray on 17 November 2012, Uddhav became the leader of the party but refused to take the title "Shiv Sena Pramukh" (Eng : Shiv Sena Supremo).

Ideology shifts 
The Shiv Sena party's ideology has undergone changes since its formation. Initially, it started with the ideology of Marathi regionalism under the leadership of Balasaheb Thackeray. However, the party shifted towards ultranationalism and right-wing populism over time, which helped them form an alliance with the Bharatiya Janata Party (BJP).  When Uddhav Thackeray became the party leader, he gradually shifted towards composite nationalism and formed an alliance with the Congress and Nationalist Congress Party (NCP). This shift in ideology was a significant departure from Shiv Sena's traditional stance, as the party had been historically opposed to the Congress and NCP for the majority of its existence. This change in stance did not sit well with some party members, including Eknath Shinde, who requested Uddhav to stick to the original ideology of Balasaheb Thackeray.
However, Uddhav chose to change the party's ideology to maintain the alliance with the Maha Vikas Aaghadi. This led to a legal battle between the factions, which resulted in Eknath Shinde taking control of the party.

2022 Maharashtra political crisis and split 
Following the 2019 Maharashtra Legislative Assembly election, which was contested by Shiv Sena as part of an alliance with the BJP.

In January 2018, Shiv Sena officially cut ties with the BJP and their National Democratic Alliance (NDA) coalition ahead of the 2019 Indian general election after nearly 30 years of campaigning alongside the BJP. But in February 2019, BJP and Shiv Sena announced the resumption of their alliance for the general elections as well as the 2019 Maharashtra Legislative Assembly election. The election saw Shiv Sena lose votes, after which they declined to support the BJP in forming a government over the BJP's refusal to engage in power-sharing. Shiv Sena withdrew from the NDA, precipitating a political crisis in late October-early November 2019. Ultimately, the crisis led to party leader Uddhav becoming Chief Minister through the support of the Indian National Congress and the Nationalist Congress Party. The three parties formed the Maha Vikas Aghadi sub-alliance to govern Maharashtra.

In 2022, during a party meeting, Uddhav explained his move to pull out of NDA to join the United Progressive Alliance. "We supported the BJP wholeheartedly to enable them to fulfil their national ambitions. The understanding was they will go national while we will lead in Maharashtra. But we were betrayed and attempts were made to destroy us in our home. So we had to hit back". Thackeray accused BJP of dumping its allies according to its political convenience. He said, "BJP doesn't mean Hindutva. I stand by my comment that Shiv Sena had wasted 25 years in alliance with BJP."

Shinde was in favor of breaking the Maha Vikas Aghadi and reestablishing alliance with the BJP. He requested Uddhav to break the Maha Vikas Aghadi alliance due to ideological differences and unfair treatment by Congress Party and NCP. His fellow Shiv Sena members said that their complaints were ignored by Uddhav and he favored Congress Party and NCP over his own Shiv Sena members. Shinde gathered 2/3rd members from his party to support his request. The crisis began on 21 June 2022 when Shinde and several other MLAs of the Maha Vikas Aghadi (MVA) coalition moved to Surat in BJP-governed Gujarat, throwing the coalition into a chaos.
As a result of Shinde's revolt, Uddhav Thackeray resigned from the post of Chief Minister of Maharashtra and said that he will also resign from the Maharashtra Legislative Council. 
Shinde successfully reestablished alliance with BJP and was sworn in as the 20th Chief Minister, with BJP's Devendra Fadnavis as the Deputy Chief Minister.

Election Commission intervention
Following a split in the Shiv Sena political party, both Uddhav and Shinde claimed the party's name and symbol, causing widespread confusion. Shinde subsequently filed a petition  in the Election Commission of India (ECI) staking his claim to the 'Shiv Sena' name and the bow and arrow symbol. The ECI ruled in favor of Shinde's faction based on the strength of its legislative wing, rather than on the organizational wing, as the latest Constitution of the party was not on record. The Election Commission also found the changes made to the Shiv Sena party constitution in 2018, under the leadership of Uddhav Thackeray, to be undemocratic. The amendments centralized the party's control and were criticized for not allowing free, fair, and transparent elections for the party positions. The Shinde faction was found to have the majority in the legislative wing, with 40 Members in the Legislative Assembly and 13 Members of Parliament supporting it. As a result, the ECI allowed Shinde's faction to retain the Shiv Sena name and the bow and arrow symbol.

After hearing on 17 February 2023 the Election Commission recognized Eknath Shinde's faction as the real Shiv Sena. Uddhav appealed against the decision in the Supreme Court.

Party structure and caste composition

Structure
The Shiv Sena (SS) is led by a president, traditionally referred to as the "Shiv Sena Pramukh," which translates to "Shiv Sena Chief" in English. Bal Thackeray served as the first Shiv Sena Pramukh and took all major decisions while the activists and members of the Shiv Sena, known as Shiv Sainiks, carried out most of the party's grassroots work. During his last days, the day-to-day activities of the party were handled by his youngest son Uddhav Thackeray, who succeeded him as party leader after his death in 2012. 

The present Mukhya neta of the party is Eknath Shinde, who assumed the post in 2023 after overtaking the party.

Shiv Sena has a network of grassroots organizations, known as "Shiv Sena Shakhas". The Shakhas serve as the primary unit of the party, with each Shakha consisting of 25-50 members. The Shakhas are responsible for carrying out the party's activities at the grassroots level, such as mobilizing voters during elections, organizing protests and rallies, and engaging in community service activities.

In addition to the Shakhas, the party has various other organizational structures, including the Yuva Sena, ( army) party's youth wing, and the Mahila Aghadi, the party's women's wing. The Shiv Sena is also affiliated with the Sthaniya Lokadhikar Samiti, which advocates for the preservation of employment rights for Maharashtrians in Maharashtra.

Prior to the rebellion by its prominent leader Eknath Shinde in 2022 the party was in hand of Thackeray family, thus most of the important positions was hold by Bal Thackeray's son and grandson that is Uddhav and Aditya Thackeray respectively. Opposition parties frequently alleged Shiva Sena as a dynastic political party. Bal Thackeray never remained on any elected political position but he never vacated the position of Shiva Sena supremo and ruled as a Godfather or king maker.

In 2019 first time ever Thackeray family directly participated in election when Aditya contested for a seat of MLA, later his father debuted in direct politics and became chief minister of the state. Aditya was the tourism minister his father's cabinet.

Caste composition
People of various Maharashtrian castes worked together in the Sena. The party's leaders mostly came from the so-called "high castes" that is Brahmins, Chandraseniya Kayastha Prabhu and Pathare Prabhus - Thackerey, Manohar Joshi, Sudhir Joshi, Balwant Mantri, Hemchandra Gupte, Shyam Deshmukh, Madhav Deshpande, Datta Pradhan, Vijay Parvatkar, Madhukar Sarpotdar and Pramod Navalkar.
One of the above-mentioned leaders, Hemchandra Gupte, who was Mayor of Bombay in the early 70s and was the former family physician and confidante of Thackerays, quit Shivsena citing flaws such as importance given to money, violence committed by the Shivsainiks and Bal Thackeray's support to then prime minister Indira Gandhi during the 1975 emergency.

There were also leaders from other castes such as Dattaji Salvi, Dattaji Nalawade and Wamanrao Mahadik, and those from the so-called lower castes such as Chaggan Bhujbal, Leeladhar Dake, Bhai Shingre and Vijay Gaonkar.

Over the years, other than the Bal Thackeray, there have been twelve senior leaders in the party, out of these, eight have been from
upper caste (four were Brahmins, two Chandraseniya Kayastha Prabhu and two Pathare Prabhus). Others have been either Maratha (Dattaji Salvi), Shimpi (Wamanrao Mahadik), Agri (Leeladhar Dake) or Mali (Chaggan Bhujbal). In fact, Bhujbal quit the party accusing the party is biased towards upper cast people.

The number of Dalits were also not insignificant and even after the Sena opposed the reservations proposed by the Mandal commission, there was no dent in the percentage of Other Backward Class in the party. In this way, the Sena was successful in uniting all Maharashtrians irrespective of caste under the common "Marathi umbrella". The agenda of preferential treatment for the "sons of the soil" that is Maharashtrians brought them all together.

Voter base
Shiv Sena's strength in the late 1980s and early '90s mainly came from the support of the Maratha caste - which it drew away from the Congress. Citing the large percentage of MLAs elected from Shiv Sena belonging to the Maratha caste, Vora from the University of Pune concludes that the Shiv Sena has been emerging as a "Maratha Party".

Headquarter 
Shiva Sena's headquarter and main office is situated at Anand Dighe's house in Thane. Dighe was Guru and mentor of Shiva Sena Mukhy neta (Main leader) Eknath Shinde. The headquarter was relocated after Shinde took over the party from Uddhav Thackeray.

Before 24 February 2023 Shivsena Bhavan, a building was the central office of the Shiv Sena in Mumbai. It was located on Ram Ganesh Gadkari Chowk and Shivaji Park in Dadar. It was inaugurated on 19 June 1977. The refurbished Sena Bhavan was inaugurated on 27 July 2006. It has a Copper Statue of Shivaji Maharaj and a large Poster of Balasaheb Thackeray. Matoshri, the house of Uddhav was an important building in this party. Many high-profile meeting are usually held in it. It worked as a command and control centre of the party in Bal –Uddhava's regime.

In the 1993 Bombay bombings, terrorists planted powerful bomb in Shiv Sena Bhavan, it exploded and the building got damaged.

List of Chief Ministers

Following is the list of the Chief Ministers of Maharashtra from Shiv Sena.

List of Union Ministers
 Manohar Joshi: Heavy Industries and Public Enterprises, 13th Speaker of the Lok Sabha
 Anandrao Vithoba Adsul: Ministry of State, Finance and Company Affairs
 Suresh Prabhu :Minister of Chemicals and Fertilizers, Ministry of Power, Ministry of Heavy Industries and Public Enterprises
 Anant Geete: Heavy Industries and Public Enterprises, Minister of Power
 Arvind Sawant: Ministry of Heavy Industries and Public Enterprises

Electoral performance

Lok Sabha elections

Maharashtra Vidhan Sabha elections

Activities and criticism
The Sena says it has played a central role in the emancipation of 500,000 slum dwellers in the Dharavi area of Mumbai, the largest slum in Asia. However, the policy of giving free houses to slum dwellers has been controversial since it was introduced by the then Shiv Sena-BJP government.

In the 1970s, Shiv Sena was opposed to the Namantar Andolan, a Dalit-led movement to change the name of Marathwada University in Aurangabad to "Dr. Babasaheb Ambedkar University", and supported views of conservative Marathas.

In 1996, Shiv Sena organised the first and only live concert of American pop icon Michael Jackson in India to raise the funds for its business wing and to help create over two-hundred seventy thousand jobs for people of Maharashtra.

In December 2003, Shiv Sena activists damaged the cricket pitch of the Agra Sport Stadium which was supposed to host the cricket match between Pakistan and India. In April 2005, Bharatiya Vidyarthi Sena, the student wing of Shiv Sena, attempted to prevent the India-Pakistan One-day international match being held in New Delhi. The protester's spokesman demanded:

The Sena acted as a "moral police" and opposed Valentine's Day celebrations. On 14 February 2006, Bal Thackeray condemned and apologised for the violent attacks by its Shiv Sainiks on a private celebration in Mumbai. "It is said that women were beaten up in the Nallasopara incident. If that really happened, then it is a symbol of cowardice. I have always instructed Shiv Sainiks that in any situation women should not be humiliated and harassed." Thackeray and the Shiv Sena remained opposed to it, although they indicated support for an "Indian alternative".

On 20 November 2009, Shiv Sena activists attacked and vandalised the offices of Hindi and Marathi TV news channels IBN7 and IBN-Lokmat, located in Mumbai and Pune respectively. The Shivsainik slapped IBN7's senior editor Ravindra Ambekar and then attacked IBN-Lokmat's editor Nikhil Wagle. Shiv Sena attributed the attacks to the criticisms of Bal Thackeray by the news channel over his remarks on Sachin Tendulkar. Shiv Sena's Rajya Sabha MP Sanjay Raut described the attacks as "spontaneous". Shiv Sena spokespersons tried to justify the attacks and refused to apologize for their acts of violence.

Shiv Sena got an entry in Guinness Book of World Records in 2010 for "collecting maximum blood in a day". Shiv Sena organized a blood donation camp which collected over 24,000 bottles of blood in a single day. Later this world record was broken by a blood donation camp of HDFC Bank in 2014.

On 2 November 2014, during the Kiss of Love protest against moral policing, members of Shiv Sena, Bajrang Dal, Vishwa Hindu Parishad and many other right wing groups opposed and attacked protestors and threatened to strip protestors for kissing on the streets. These opposing groups claimed that public display of affection is against both Indian culture and the law of the land (under section 294 of the Indian Penal Code), though according to the Supreme Court and the Delhi High Court, kissing in public is not a criminal offence. Police took many of the Kiss of Love protestors into custody to save their lives, but were blamed for giving a free hand to counter protestors of the right wing groups.

In October 2015, Shiv Sena issued threats which enforced a ban on a scheduled concert by Pakistani classic singer Ghulam Ali. The move was adopted to appease anti-Pakistan constituents to vote for Sena in coming elections. However, in 2015 Pakistan urged the international community to take note of the activities of Shiv Sena, while Shiv Sena claimed that criticism of Shiv Sena by Pakistan vindicates "our patriotism".

On 19 October 2015, Shiv Sena activists attacked and vandalised the office of BCCI to stop a meeting between PCB and BCCI officials. The activists shouted anti-Pakistan slogans and held posters that read 'Shahryar Khan go back', determined to stop Manohar from meeting his Pakistani counterpart. Shiv Sena has also threatened to stop Pakistan's Aleem Dar from officiating in the fifth and final ODI between India and South Africa.

In 2015 Shiv Sena announced 10,000 rupees help to each drought-affected farmer of Marathwada region, while they also announced 2 lakh rupees "reward" to Hindus family who had 5 children between 2010 and 2015 in Uttar Pradesh. As per Shiv Sena, the reason behind the "reward" was "decline in growth rate of Hindu population compared to Muslim population as per recent census".

In January 2016, the Shiv Sena demanded that the words “secular” and “socialist” be “permanently removed” from the Constitution's Preamble which were added in the 42nd amendment during the emergency. In April 2019, party member Sanjay Raut called for the burka to be banned.

During the 2018 Maharashtra Council election and the 2014 Lok Sabha elections, many candidates fielded by Shiv Sena had criminal records or had criminal charges pending against them.

Explanatory notes

See also
List of Hindu nationalist political parties

References

Further reading
 Ethnicity and Equality: The Shiv Sena Party and Preferential Policies in Bombay, MF Katzenstein – 1979 – Cornell University Press
 Warriors in Politics: Hindu Nationalism, Violence, and the Shiv Sena in India, S Banerjee – 2000 – Westview Press
 The Charisma of Direct Action: Power, Politics, and the Shiv Sena, JM Eckert – 2003 – Oxford University Press
 Shiv Sena: An Assessment, Palshikar, Suhas, Department of Politics and Public Administration, University of Pune, Pune (1999)
 Maximum City: Bombay Lost and Found, 'Power', chapter 3, Mumbai, Mehta, Suketu, Penguin Books (2005)

External links
  
 

 
Far-right political parties in India
Far-right politics in India
Political parties established in 1966
1966 establishments in Maharashtra
Indian nationalist political parties
Hindu nationalism
Conservative parties in India
Regionalist parties in India
Anti-Pakistan sentiment
Right-wing populism in India
Right-wing populist parties
Anti-Islam sentiment in India